The 2019 Chicago Red Stars season was the team's eleventh season and seventh season in the National Women's Soccer League, the top tier of women's soccer in the United States.

First-team squad

2019 squad 
Updated August 12, 2019 
Players under contract to play for the club during 2019 season.
bold type indicates player played for her national team.

Player transactions

2019 NWSL College Draft

In

Out

Management and staff
Front Office
 Owner: Arnim Whisler
Coaching Staff
Manager: Rory Dames
Assistant coach: Craig Harrington
Assistant coach: Gary Curneen
Goalkeeper coach: Jordi King
Strength & Conditioning Coach: Evan Johnson
Volunteer Assistant Coach: Brian Kibler

Competitions

League standing

Results summary

Results by round

Weekly schedule

All times are in Central Time unless otherwise noted.

Preseason

Regular season

Postseason playoffs

Statistical leaders

Top scorers

Top assists

Shutouts

Honors and awards

NWSL Monthly Award

NWSL Player of the Month

NWSL Team of the Month

NWSL Weekly Awards

NWSL Player of the Week

NWSL Goal of the Week

NWSL Save of the Week

References

Match reports (preseason)

Match reports (regular season)

Match report (postseason playoff)

Notes

External links 

 

2019
Chicago Red Stars
Chicago Red Stars
Chicago Red Stars